The Seal of the Blue Lotus is the debut studio album of composer and guitarist Robbie Basho, released in 1965 by Takoma Records.

Release and reception
Skip Jansen, of Allmusic, favorably compared Basho's Eastern-influenced musical approach to that of John Fahey and noted the influence of Ravi Shankar. Jansen gave the album four out of five stars, concluding that it is "An essential document for folk guitar fans."

In 1996, Takoma Records issued The Seal of the Blue Lotus for the first time on Compact Disc, with an alternate cover. The album has again been re-issued by 4 Men With Beards on 180 gram vinyl

Track listing

Personnel
Adapted from The Seal of the Blue Lotus liner notes.
Robbie Basho – steel-string acoustic guitar, production, cover art
ED Denson – production

Release history

References

External links 
 

1965 debut albums
Robbie Basho albums
Takoma Records albums